Mullet Creek is a small river in East Falkland. It is not a major watercourse, but is best known for its part in the Falklands War On April 2, 1982, Argentinian marines led by Guillermo Sanchez-Sabarots, landed his squadron of special forces at Mullet Creek, and advanced on Stanley. By 08.30 the battle was over and the Governor had ordered his ten Royal Marines (Navy Party 8901) to surrender. The Royal Marines, the Governor and any others who wished it were shipped out to Britain.

The Argentine operation codenamed Azul (blue) began in the late evening of Thursday April 1, 1982 when the Argentine destroyer ARA Santisima Trinidad  halted 500 metres off Mullet Creek and lowered 21 Gemini assault craft into the water. They contained 84 special forces troopers  of Lieutenant-Commander Guillermo Sanchez-Sabarots' 1st Amphibious Commandos Group and a small party under Lieutenant-Commander Pedro Giachino, who was normally 2IC (second-in-command) of the 1st Marine Infantry Battalion, that was to capture Government House. The Argentine Rear Admiral Jorge Allara had requested that Rex Hunt surrender peacefully, but the proposal was rejected.

References

Rivers of East Falkland